The Galloping Cowboy is a 1926 American silent Western film directed by William James Craft and starring Bill Cody and Edmund Cobb.

Cast
 Bill Cody as Bill Crane 
 Alex Hart as Pete Perry (Bill's Uncle) 
 Edmund Cobb as Jack Perry 
 Barney Gilmore as Prof. Pinkleby 
 Florence Ulrich as Mary Pinkleby 
 Richard Cummings as Sheriff 
 David Dunbar as Pedro 
 Janet Gaynor as Extra

References

Bibliography
 Darby, William. Masters of Lens and Light: A Checklist of Major Cinematographers and Their Feature Films. Scarecrow Press, 1991.

External links
 

1926 films
1926 Western (genre) films
Films directed by William James Craft
American black-and-white films
Associated Exhibitors films
Silent American Western (genre) films
1920s English-language films
1920s American films